Space Launch Complex 6 (SLC-6, pronounced "Slick Six") at Vandenberg Space Force Base in California is a launch pad and support area. The site was originally developed for Titan III rockets and the Manned Orbiting Laboratory, but these were cancelled before construction of SLC-6 was complete. The complex was later rebuilt to serve as the west coast launch site for the Space Shuttle, but went unused due to budget, safety and political considerations. The pad was subsequently used for several Athena rocket launches before being modified to support the Delta IV launch vehicle family, which used the pad since 2006. The pad is now vacant after the launch of NROL-91 on September 24, 2022, and no future launches are planned.

Launches from Vandenberg fly southward, allowing payloads to be placed in high-inclination orbits such as polar or Sun-synchronous orbit, which allow full global coverage on a regular basis and are often used for weather, Earth observation, and reconnaissance satellites. These orbits are difficult to reach from Cape Canaveral Space Force Station, where launches must fly eastward due to major population centers to both the north and south of Kennedy Space Center. Avoiding these would require major inefficient maneuvering, greatly reducing payload capacity.

History

SLC-6, part of Vandenberg's "South Base," was originally part of the Sudden Ranch, prior to its purchase by the U.S. Air Force in the mid-1960s under the law of eminent domain. In addition to the ranch, the Point Arguello lighthouse was based there, which in 1967 was replaced by an automated light. There was also the Point Arguello LORAN station, deestablished December 31, 1979.  With the purchase of the base, the Air Force started construction of the SLC-6 facility on March 12, 1966, to support launches of a modified Titan III for the Manned Orbiting Laboratory (MOL). After significant construction work was completed, the MOL program was cancelled on June 10, 1969, so further work on SLC-6 stopped as the facility was placed in mothball status.

With plans of launching civilian and military equatorial space shuttle flights from Kennedy Space Center (KSC) and military polar orbit flights from Vandenberg, NASA and the Air Force looked at different sites for launching the shuttle, finally deciding upon SLC-6, due to its dedicated crewed spaceflight role that was left over from the canceled MOL/Titan program.

In 1972, Vandenberg AFB was chosen as the western launch site for Air Force shuttle launches. Use of SLC-6 was approved in 1975, and re-construction of the former MOL launch facility occurred between January 1979 and July 1986 as SLC-6 was rebuilt to accommodate the space shuttle.

There were several reasons for using SLC-6:
Florida shuttle launches to polar orbit would have entailed a large payload penalty;
Florida shuttle launches to polar orbit would necessitate overflying South Carolina, and the discarded external tank would overfly Canada and Russia, and
Use of the existing and partially constructed Titan III facilities at SLC-6 would reduce building costs for the shuttle launch complex.

A Senate report summarized: "The Air Force originally justified the expenditure of such SLC-6 funding on the basis of a need to launch high-priority military payloads into polar orbits. After Defense Department officials testified that polar orbits could not be achieved by launching from Kennedy Space Center in Florida, the Congress initiated construction of ... SLC-6."

There were significant layout differences between the shuttle launch complexes at KSC and SLC-6 at Vandenberg. KSC had the Orbiter Processing Facility, Shuttle Runway facility, Mate-Demate Device (for loading the Orbiter on the Shuttle Carrier Aircraft), the Vehicle Assembly Building, and Launch Complex 39. SLC-6 consolidated the VAB (stacking) and LC-39 (launching) functions, while a processing facility, located at North Base, would have handled the vehicle processing, along with providing a Mate-Demate Device, and a  runway for Shuttle landings.

Space Shuttle

Over $4 billion were spent on the new Space Shuttle modifications. The original Mobile Service Tower (MST) was lowered in height and two new flame ducts were added for the shuttle's solid rocket boosters. Additional modifications or improvements included liquid hydrogen and liquid oxygen storage tanks, a payload preparation room, payload changeout room, a new launch tower with escape system for the shuttle crew members, sound suppression system and water reclamation area and a Shuttle Assembly Building were added to the original complex.

Turn-around servicing and refurbishing of the orbiter would be accomplished in the adjacent Orbiter Maintenance and Processing Facility (OMPF).

SLC-6 was declared operational during acceptance ceremonies held on October 15, 1985. However, much additional work and testing was still required. Use of the prototype orbiter Enterprise was obtained, in order that she could be mated with External Tank and SRBs in boilerplate configuration, and used for a series of fit checks like those conducted at LC-39.

The inaugural polar-orbit flight, designated STS-62-A and using Discovery with Shuttle veteran Robert Crippen as commander, was planned for 15 October 1986. However, the Challenger Disaster of 28 January 1986 grounded the Shuttle fleet as efforts were concentrated on recovery and returning the program to flight after a two-year hiatus.

On July 31, 1986, Secretary of the Air Force Edward C. Aldridge, Jr., announced that Vandenberg's Space Shuttle program would be placed in "operational caretaker status", six months after the Space Shuttle Challenger accident. A few months later, however, SLC-6 was placed in "minimum caretaker status" on February 20, 1987.

Eventually, on May 13, 1988, Secretary Aldridge then directed the Air Force to transfer Space Shuttle assets at Vandenberg to other organizations (specifically, the Kennedy Space Center) by September 30, 1989, the end of the fiscal year. The work was completed 10 days early on September 20, 1989, when SLC-6 was placed in mothball status.

Several factors accounted for this:
 The Challenger disaster made it clear that sole dependency on the shuttle was unwise;
 SLC-6 would have generated more contaminated waste water than originally envisioned, necessitating an expensive treatment plant;
 Further study showed more sound suppression water would have been needed, requiring upgraded water supply facilities;
 Vehicle icing would have been more problematic than in Florida, and it was unclear how well SLC-6 facilities would handle that;
 Blast protection of nearby occupied buildings was unsatisfactory and more construction would have been required to safeguard them;
 Post-Challenger, the more confined SLC-6 launch area raised concerns of entrapped gaseous hydrogen causing a fire or explosion;
 Large construction cost overruns, and
 Independent audits found significant construction quality problems that would have been expensive to fix.

The Air Force officially terminated the Space Shuttle program at Vandenberg on December 26, 1989. The estimated cost for the discontinued program was $4 billion.

Six months later on July 6, 1990, Lockheed Space Operations Company (LSOC) was awarded an Air Force ground system contract to modify SLC-6 into a Titan IV/Centaur launch complex—essentially an uprated facility from the original MOL program that would have launched a Titan III vehicle. Site work was scheduled to begin in late-FY 1992, and lead to an initial launch capability sometime in FY1996.

However, on March 22, 1991, HQ USAF reversed itself again by announcing the termination of the Titan IV/Centaur program at SLC-6. The reasons given for the project being canceled was due to "insufficient Titan IV launch requirements from the West Coast to support the construction of a new launch pad." The contract with LSOC was closed out several months later.

Reactivation
Since the shutdown of SLC-6 for the shuttle program, the U.S. Air Force reverted to flying military polar orbit satellites using the Titan 34D and later Titan IV rockets.

Nevertheless, the utilization of SLC-6 was far from over. In the early 1990s, Lockheed Missiles and Space Company began studies on the prospect of a new family of small launch vehicles for commercial and other users. Lockheed eventually approved the development of the Lockheed Launch Vehicle (LLV) program in January 1993. After the merger of Lockheed with Martin Marietta, the renamed Lockheed Martin Launch Vehicle (LMLV) eventually would take on the moniker of Athena.

After another contract was issued in 1994 by the Air Force, modification work began on the existing SLC-6 shuttle launch mount for a small "milkstool" platform to be located over one of the two exhaust ducts originally intended for one of the large solid rocket boosters. The first operational launch from SLC-6 occurred on August 15, 1995, involving the Lockheed-Martin Launch Vehicle I (LMLV-1). Unfortunately, LMLV-1 was terminated in mid-flight after uncontrolled oscillations of the rocket were detected. This resulted in the loss of the vehicle and the payload. The cause of the mishap was later determined to be a guidance system failure coupled with overheating of the booster's first stage steering mechanism. The payload on board was GEMstar 1, a small communications satellite manufactured by CTA, Inc. for the Volunteers in Technical Assistance (VITA), a non-profit organization.

After some hardware redesign and testing, a newly rechristened Athena I successfully launched NASA's Lewis satellite into orbit from SLC-6 on August 22, 1997. Part of NASA's Small Spacecraft Technology Initiative (SSTI) and "Mission to Planet Earth" program.

Another launch, on September 24, 1999, was successful as an Ikonos satellite operated by Space Imaging (later acquired by ORBIMAGE to form GeoEye) was successfully placed into a polar orbit using an Athena 2 booster.

However, with the advent of the Delta IV rocket and Atlas V launch vehicles in the late 1990s, The Boeing Company received a lease from the Air Force on September 1, 1999, to modify SLC-6 once again to launch Boeing's Delta IV.

Some of the Shuttle-specific components at SLC-6 were removed, such as the mobile Payload Changeout Room, but the Assembly Building, Mobile Service Tower, Launch Tower, flame deflection trenches and sound suppression system and some other shuttle-oriented equipment were retained and made compatible for the new Delta IV rocket. The launch vehicle's Common Booster Core and associated flight hardware is transported from the Boeing factory in Decatur, Ala., to Vandenberg via the  cargo vessel that docks just south of SLC-6 at the same location originally constructed for receiving and offloading space shuttle external tanks.

Delta IV

Boeing developed the Delta IV class of vehicles as its entrant in the Department of Defense's Evolved Expendable Launch Vehicle (EELV) program. The main objective of EELV is aimed at cutting launch costs and simplifying the process of getting satellites into space. Boeing's main competitor, Lockheed Martin, has a similar class of vehicles known as the Atlas V that made its West Coast debut in early March 2008, flying from the modified Space Launch Complex-3 East on South Base.

After sitting on the pad since late-2003 and enduring technical issues with both the booster and the payload, the first of the Delta IV launch vehicles to fly from SLC-6 successfully lifted off at 8:33 p.m. PDT on 27 June 2006.

The Delta IV Medium+ (4,2) rocket lofted NROL-22, a classified satellite for the National Reconnaissance Office, into orbit. The payload was successfully deployed approximately 54 minutes later.

According to a post-launch Boeing News press release, the mission was the first for the NRO aboard a Delta IV and the second aboard a Delta rocket. The first was the GeoLITE mission in 2001 aboard a Delta II.

Another Delta IV Medium vehicle flew a mission for the Air Force Defense Meteorological Satellite Program, orbiting DMSP-17, on 4 November 2006.

On 20 January 2011, at 1:10 p.m. PST, USA-224 (NROL-49) was launched atop a Delta IV Heavy rocket. The launch was conducted by United Launch Alliance and was the first flight of a Delta IV Heavy from Vandenberg.

On September 24, 2022, ULA launched the last Delta IV Heavy from the pad, concluding their use of SLC-6. The pad is currently vacant with no launches planned. Vulcan Centaur, Delta IV Heavy's successor, will operate on SLC-3 at Vandenberg, currently used by Atlas V.

Launch history

References

External links
 Boeing Media Kit for Delta IV Launch of NROL-22
 History/Chronology of Vandenberg AFB
 Boeing Corporation's Delta IV Space Launch Complex Six photo gallery
 LighthouseFriends.com - Point Arguello
 Space Shuttle SLC-6 Chronology (in French) - Capcomespace.net
 Vandenberg Space Shuttle Operations - featuring space photography of William G. Hartenstein

Location: 

Vandenberg Space Force Base
Launch complexes of the United States Space Force